Felipe Angel Montemayor (born February 7, 1928) is a Mexican former professional baseball player.

Counting his service in the U.S. minor leagues, Montemayor played 21 seasons of professional baseball. His MLB career consisted of 28- (1953) and 36- (1955) game stints for the Pirates. Montemayor made his major league debut on April 14, 1953, and hit a fly-ball out against Joe Black of the Brooklyn Dodgers. His only two career home runs came in both games of a doubleheader against the St. Louis Cardinals on May 1, 1955. The blows—each with one runner on base—were struck off Floyd Wooldridge (Game 1) and Gordon Jones (Game 2). During his MLB career Montemayor batted .173, with 26 hits; five doubles and three triples accompanied his two homers.

References

External links

1928 births
Living people
Águilas de Mexicali players
Baseball players from Nuevo León
Broncos de Reynosa players
Charleston Senators players
Diablos Rojos del México players
Industriales de Monterrey players
Sultanes de Monterrey players
Major League Baseball players from Mexico
Mexican Baseball Hall of Fame inductees
Mexican expatriate baseball players in the United States
New Orleans Pelicans (baseball) players
Pittsburgh Pirates players
Piratas de Campeche players
St. Paul Saints (AA) players
Sportspeople from Monterrey
Tigres del México players
Victoria Rosebuds players